Love at Twenty is a 1962 French-produced omnibus project of Pierre Roustang, consisting of five segments directed by five directors from five countries. It was entered into the 12th Berlin International Film Festival.

The first segment, titled Antoine and Colette is by François Truffaut (France) and returns actor Jean-Pierre Léaud to the role of Antoine Doinel, a role he played three years earlier in The 400 Blows and would return to again in 1968 (Stolen Kisses), 1970 (Bed and Board) and 1979 (Love on the Run).  It concerns the frustrations of love for the now 17-year-old Doinel and the unresponsive girl he adores.  The second segment, the directorial debut of 21-year-old Renzo Rossellini (Italy), son of Roberto Rossellini and later a noted producer himself, tells the story of a tough mistress who loses her lover to an older, wealthier and more-appreciative woman.  The third, by Japanese film director Shintarō Ishihara is described as a "weird, grotesque" and "clumsy" tale of obsessive and morbid love.  Fourth is Marcel Ophüls (Germany) with a "charming, but somewhat sentimental" story of an unwed mother who contrives to trap the father of her baby.  Finally the fifth segment, by Andrzej Wajda (Poland) entitled Warszawa depicts a brief intergenerational liaison based upon multiple misunderstandings.  The episodes are tied together with still photos by Henri Cartier-Bresson and a wistful jazz soundtrack by Georges Delerue.

Truffaut's and Wajda's segments (the first and the last, respectively) are considered the highlights of the collection.

Cast
 Jean-Pierre Léaud as Antoine Doinel (segment Antoine and Colette)
 Marie-France Pisier as Colette (segment Antoine and Colette)
 Patrick Auffay as René (segment Antoine and Colette)
 Rosy Varte as La mère de Colette (segment Antoine and Colette)
 François Darbon as Le beau-père de Colette (segment Antoine and Colette)
 Jean-François Adam as Albert Tazzi (segment Antoine and Colette)
 Pierre Schaeffer as himself (segment Antoine and Colette)
 Cristina Gaioni as Christina (as Christina Gajoni)
 Geronimo Meynier as Leonardo
 Eleonora Rossi Drago as Valentina
 Nami Tamura as Fukimo
 Koji Furuhata as Hiroshi
 Barbara Frey as Ursula
 Christian Doermer as Tonio
 Vera Tschechowa
 Werner Finck
 Barbara Lass as Basia (segment "Warszawa")
 Zbigniew Cybulski as Zbyszek (segment "Warszawa")
 Władysław Kowalski as Wladek (segment "Warszawa")

References

External links

1962 films
1962 drama films
West German films
1960s French-language films
1960s Italian-language films
1960s Japanese-language films
1960s Polish-language films
1960s German-language films
French anthology films
German anthology films
Italian anthology films
Japanese anthology films
French black-and-white films
German black-and-white films
Italian black-and-white films
Japanese black-and-white films
Polish black-and-white films
Films directed by François Truffaut
Films directed by Andrzej Wajda
Films directed by Renzo Rossellini
Films directed by Shintarō Ishihara
Films directed by Marcel Ophuls
Antoine Doinel
Films with screenplays by François Truffaut
Films scored by Georges Delerue
1960s multilingual films
French multilingual films
Italian multilingual films
Japanese multilingual films
Polish multilingual films
German multilingual films
1960s Japanese films